46 Boötis is a binary star system in the northern constellation of Boötes, located mid-way between α Coronae Borealis and ε Boötis. It has the Bayer designation b Boötis; 46 Boötis is the Flamsteed designation. The system lies 478 light-years away from the Sun based on parallax, and is visible to the naked eye as a faint, orange-hued star with a combined apparent visual magnitude of 5.67. It is moving away from the Earth with a heliocentric radial velocity of +19 km/s. The light from this system displays an unusually high level of polarization due to interstellar dust.

The primary member, designated component A, is an aging giant star with a stellar classification of K2 III. As a consequence of exhausting the hydrogen at its core, it has expanded to 23 times the Sun's radius. The companion star, component B, is most likely a lower main-sequence star with 0.6–0.8 times the Sun's mass.

References

External links
 HR 5638
 Image 46 Boötis

K-type giants
Spectroscopic binaries
Boötes
Bootis, b
Durchmusterung objects
Bootis, 46
134320
074087
5638